Darren Willis may refer to:

Darren Willis (American football) (born 1964), Arizona State and Tampa Bay Storm player
Darren Willis (rugby league) (born 1968), Penrith Panthers and Western Suburbs player